The 2014 China Baseball League season was severely truncated, after being twice delayed, with each team only playing two three-game series before the finals between the top-ranked sides. The Tianjin Lions defeated the Beijing Tigers 2 games to 1 to win the championship.

Final standings

External links
Chinese Baseball Association 

China Baseball League
2014 in baseball
2014 in Chinese sport